The Magnificat is a Christian canticle found in the Gospel of Luke.

Magnificat may also refer to:

Settings of the canticle
 Magnificat in E-flat major, BWV 243a, a 1723 choral work by Johann Sebastian Bach
 Magnificat in D major, BWV 243, a 1733 choral work by J.S. Bach, based on the former
 Magnificat (C. P. E. Bach), a choral work by Carl Philipp Emanuel Bach
 Magnificat (Bruckner), a choral work by Anton Bruckner
 Magnificat, a choral work by Francesco Durante sometimes misattributed to Giovanni Battista Pergolesi
 Magnificat (Pärt), a choral work by Arvo Pärt
 Magnificat (Penderecki)
 Magnificat (Rutter), a choral work by John Rutter
 Magnificat (Schütz), compositions by Heinrich Schütz, four extant, two lost
 Magnificat (Schubert), a choral work by Franz Schubert
 Magnificat (Vaughan Williams), a 1932 composition for contralto, women's chorus and orchestra by Ralph Vaughan Williams
 Magnificat (Vivaldi), RV 610, 610a, 610b, 611, a work by Vivaldi

Music 
 Magnificat Baroque Ensemble, an American early-music ensemble
 Magnificat, an album by David and the Giants

Schools 
 Magnificat Academy, a Catholic middle school and high school in Warren, Massachusetts, U.S.
 Magnificat High School, an all-girls high school in Rocky River, Ohio, U.S.

Other uses 
 Magnificat (film), a 1993 Italian drama
 Magnificat (novel), a novel in the Galactic Milieu Series by Julian May

See also 
 Ballet Magnificat!
 Madonna of the Magnificat, a 1481 painting by Sandro Botticelli
 Magnificat Meal Movement
 Monasterium Magnificat
 Novus Magnificat, a 1986 album by Constance Demby